Nepenthes × merrilliata (a blend of merrilliana and alata) is a natural hybrid involving N. alata and N. merrilliana. Like its two parent species, it is endemic to the Philippines, but limited by the natural range of N. merrilliana to Samar as well as Mindanao and its offshore islands.

References

 Fleming, R. 1979.   Carnivorous Plant Newsletter 8(1): 10–12.
 Mann, P. 1998. A trip to the Philippines. Carnivorous Plant Newsletter 27(1): 6–11.
 McPherson, S.R. & V.B. Amoroso 2011. Field Guide to the Pitcher Plants of the Philippines. Redfern Natural History Productions, Poole.
 CP Database: Nepenthes × merrilliata

Carnivorous plants of Asia
merrilliata
Nomina nuda
Flora of the Visayas
Flora of Mindanao
Plants described in 1979